

Acronyms
ISEL can refer to:
Instituto Superior de Engenharia de Lisboa, a Portuguese school of engineering
Industrial Syndicalist Education League, a British syndicalist organisation

Geographic names
Isel, Cumbria, a dispersed settlement in North West England
Isel Hall, ancient residence in Isel, Cumbria
Isel (river), East Tyrol, Austria, a major early tributary of the Drava
Mount Isel, misnomer for Bergisel, a hill near Innsbruck, Austria
Isel Park, a historic park in Stoke, New Zealand

People
Isel López (born 1970), Cuban female javelin thrower
Isel Saavedra (born 1971), Cuban female volleyball player